Saint-Charles-de-Bellechasse is a village with a population of 2,159 (2006 Census), established about 20 km southeast of Lévis in 1749, in the Bellechasse Regional County Municipality. Its total area is 93.12 km2. It is a rural community, with several notable businesses such as Meuble Idéal, Prodel (Cuisichef), Georges Laflamme Home Hardware, Aliments Breton, Unicoop and many small enterprises. It is also the home of the École secondaire Saint-Charles high school.

The Boyer River, CN Railway, road 218 and road 279 cross the municipality. There are two small lakes inside the municipality, lakes St.Charles and lake Beaumont.

References

  Commission de la toponymie du Québec. Saint-Charles-de-Bellechasse (Municipalité)
  Saint-Charles-de-Bellechasse official website
  [http://laboyer.com/ Saint-Charles-de-Bellechasse local newspaper Au fil de La Boyer.

Municipalities in Quebec
Incorporated places in Chaudière-Appalaches